Elachista biatomella is a moth of the family Elachistidae found in Europe.

Description
The head is pale grey, face whitish.Forewings are ochreous - whitish, irrorated with grey ; plical and second discal stigmata elongate, black, plical preceded and followed by whitish marks ; in darker specimens an oblique triangular white spot is visible on costa at 2/3, in paler specimens
it is obsolete. Hindwings are grey.The larva is yellowish ; head brown ; 2 with two pale brown spots.

Adults are on wing from May to September in two generations per year.

The larvae feed on acute sedge (Carex acuta prolixa) and glaucous sedge (Carex flacca), mining the leaves of their host plant. The mine starts at a leaf axil and ascends as a narrow corridor with a thin frass line. After , the direction of the mine reverses, resulting in an elongate and lightly inflated blotch. Pupation takes place outside of the mine. Larvae can be found from June to July and again (after overwintering within the mine) from September to April. They are yellowish with a dark brown head.

Distribution
It is found from Sweden to the Iberian peninsula, Sardinia and Italy, and from Great Britain and Ireland to Ukraine.

References

biatomella
Leaf miners
Moths described in 1848
Moths of Europe
Taxa named by Henry Tibbats Stainton